The 2019–20 Serie A1 is the 101st season of the Serie A1, Italy's premier Water polo league.

Team information

The following 14 clubs compete in the Serie A1 during the 2019–20 season:

Regular season

Pld - Played; W - Won; D - Drawn; L - Lost; GF - Goals for; GA - Goals against; Diff - Difference; Pts - Points.

References

Seasons in Italian water polo competitions
Italy
2019 in Italian sport
2020 in Italian sport
2019 in water polo
2020 in water polo